TASM or Tasm may refer to:

 Turbo Assembler, Borland's x86 assembler
 Turbo Assembler, Omikron's Commodore 64-based 6502 assembler
 Telemark Assembler, Squak Valley Software's multi-target cross-assembler
 Table Assembler, a table driven cross-assembler for small microprocessors
Tomahawk Anti-Ship Missile
Tulsa Air and Space Museum & Planetarium
The Amazing Spider-Man (disambiguation), various works with this abbreviation